Topps Tiles plc is a British national retailer based in Enderby, Leicestershire. It is listed on the London Stock Exchange.

History
Topps Tiles was founded by Alan Brindle and Edward Derbyshire and opened its first store in 1963 in Sale, Manchester. It then continued to open stores across the North West and the Midlands. In 1990, Topps Tiles merged with Tile Kingdom and consequently expanded its presence into the South and London. Stuart Williams and Barry Bester had set up Tile Kingdom in 1984, with funds from Bester's wife's business. Bester and Williams bought out Brindle and Derbyshire in 1995 and in 1997 Topps Tiles became a public limited company.

A smaller store formats, branded Topps Tiles Boutique, launched in January 2014.

It was confirmed that on 29 November 2019, CEO Matt Williams would step down from his position. He will be replaced by Rob Parker, the current finance director.

As of 2020, the company has more than 300 branches.

References

Retail companies of the United Kingdom
Home improvement companies of the United Kingdom
1963 establishments in the United Kingdom
Retail companies established in 1963
Companies based in Leicestershire
Companies listed on the London Stock Exchange